This is a list of electoral results for the electoral district of Gregory in Queensland state elections.

Members for Gregory

Election results

Elections in the 2020s

Elections in the 2010s

Elections in the 2000s

Elections in the 1990s

Elections in the 1980s

Elections in the 1970s

Elections in the 1960s

Elections in the 1950s 

The 1957 election in Gregory was delayed due to the death of incumbent MP George Devries weeks before the election. A supplementary election was held in October, two months after the rest of the state.

Elections in the 1940s

Elections in the 1930s

Elections in the 1920s

Elections in the 1910s

References

Queensland state electoral results by district